Escrick is a village and civil parish in the Selby District of North Yorkshire, England. It was historically part of the East Riding of Yorkshire until 1974. It is approximately equidistant between Selby and York on what is now the A19 road.

History and geography
Escrick sits at the southernmost limit of glaciation during the last ice age.  When the ice retreated, a deposit known as a "terminal moraine" was left behind, in the form of a ridge. The name "Escrick" may mean "ash ridge", suggesting that the village was first established in an area of Ash.

A gold Anglo-Saxon ring (the so-called "Escrick ring") was discovered in a field near Escrick by a metal detectorist in 2009 and was acquired by the Yorkshire Museum for £35,000.

During the medieval period, the village was known as "Ascri" (Ash Ridge), but by 1600 the name Escrick was in use. Escrick was developed as an Estate Village by Sir Henry Thompson who acquired the village and the Hall in 1668. Sir Henry's great grandson, Beilby Thompson, inherited the Estate in 1742. Under his ownership the village extended towards York and the Church was relocated from beside the Hall to its present site on the York Road (A19). Part of this re-organisation involved stopping the main village street at the gates to the Hall and creating a by-pass which has become the present day A19. The village's sylvan character also evolved from the time of enclosure when the open land became parkland.

Landmarks

Escrick Hall

A manor-house at Escrick existed in 1323, and in 1557 was called Escrick Hall and was a substantial house of seventeen hearths in the 1670s.

The house was rebuilt by Henry Thompson (died 1700) . The house was now two storeys high with basement and attics, and the main front was seven bays long with a central entrance. The building was later re-fronted and raised to three storeys . In 1763 John Carr of York was employed to design additions to the building adding a range which abuts the north front and extending beyond it to both east and west. A square stable block with four ranges around a central court on the north-east was added. Carr also remodelled the interior of the old house. The mid 19th century was another period of substantial building activity at Escrick. A north-west wing was added in 1846–8, and a north-eastern link to the stables was complete by 1850. Many internal alterations were carried out during the 19th century including the addition of a pump house, laundry, and dairies. The conversion of the house for school use has resulted in some new building, notably a new laboratory block on the north-west, but much of the dormitory and classroom accommodation has been contrived within the old stables and secondary rooms, thankfully leaving the principal rooms intact. The Hall and Escrick estates passed to the present owners, the Forbes Adam family, on the death of Beilby Lawley in 1920. The Hall has been occupied by Queen Margaret's School since 1949 and the park is now operated as a holiday and pleasure park.

Escrick Park is an extensive landscape park with pleasure grounds associated with  Escrick Hall. Features include: Ionic Temple, 'Menagerie' farm, pond, topiary, woodland walks, and extensive woodland rides which includes a well built cross country horse riding circuit leading through the former  Deer Park in front of the original family house.

The  Escrick Park Estate has developed from what was primarily a family-owned agriculture-based organisation into a management company which is regenerating the Estate's resources. Decline in income from agriculture has led to diversification which now embraces activities such as offering tenancies of residential properties, high quality office and light industrial units, countryside leisure facilities and holiday homes – all while respecting heritage and conservation considerations. The business aims to continue to develop its assets, to leave the estate in good order and develop its business for future generations. The team of eight employees has, through its work, helped to generate over 180 local jobs and greatly enhance the local economy.

Controversial Housing Development
The proposed development of a 4,000 house new town- Heronby- within  of the village has received massive opposition.

Parsonage Hotel
The building that today houses The Parsonage Hotel & Spa dates back to the early 1840s. The hotel is a notably popular wedding venue for local couples.

St Helen's Church
The church of St Helen has stood in its present position since 1783 when Beilby Thompson, then Lord of the Manor, replaced the 13th century church that was once situated to the west of Escrick Hall. The present building, designed in Victorian Gothic style by architect Francis Penrose, was built at the expense of Beilby Lawley in 1857.

The church houses a peal of 12 bells:

Gallery

Notes

References

A History of the County of York East Riding. Volume 3 pp. 17–28 K J Allison (1976)

External links

 Escrick Parish Council
 A detailed history of Escrick
 Escrick Conservation Area
 
 English Nature – For More Information on the terminal morraine – specifically page 46
 Escrick Park 
 Champions Case Study
 Forbes Adam/ Thompson/ Lawley (Barons Wenlock) Family of Escrick,1387–1988  

Civil parishes in North Yorkshire
Selby District
Villages in North Yorkshire